Arthur William Thorpe (born 31 July 1939) is an English former professional footballer who played as a left winger.

Career
Born in Lucknow, British India, in 1939, Thorpe began his career in non-league football with Ossett Albion in 1957, before signing for Scunthorpe United in September 1960 as a 21-year-old. Thorpe spent three years at Scunthorpe, scoring 5 goals in 27 appearances in the Football League between 1960 and 1963. Thorpe also played Bradford City, scoring 17 goals in 81 League appearances between 1963 and 1966. Thorpe also played with Bolton Wanderer, Ossett Town and Boston United.

References

1939 births
Living people
English footballers
Bolton Wanderers F.C. players
Ossett Albion A.F.C. players
Scunthorpe United F.C. players
Bradford City A.F.C. players
Ossett Town F.C. players
Boston United F.C. players
English Football League players
Association football wingers